Brimhall Nizhoni is a census-designated place (CDP) in McKinley County, New Mexico, United States. The population was 199 at the 2010 census. The Navajo Coyote Canyon Chapter House is located in Brimhall.

Geography
Brimhall Nizhoni is located at  (35.769810, -108.630803).

Demographics

As of the census of 2000, there were 373 people, 95 households, and 79 families residing in the CDP. The population density was 22.9 people per square mile (8.8/km2). There were 132 housing units at an average density of 8.1 per square mile (3.1/km2). The racial makeup of the CDP was 99.46% Native American, 0.54% from other races. Hispanic or Latino of any race were 0.54% of the population.

There were 95 households, out of which 48.4% had children under the age of 18 living with them, 47.4% were married couples living together, 29.5% had a female householder with no husband present, and 16.8% were non-families. 15.8% of all households were made up of individuals, and 4.2% had someone living alone who was 65 years of age or older. The average household size was 3.93 and the average family size was 4.37.

In the CDP, the population was spread out, with 39.1% under the age of 18, 10.5% from 18 to 24, 25.7% from 25 to 44, 19.6% from 45 to 64, and 5.1% who were 65 years of age or older. The median age was 26 years. For every 100 females, there were 90.3 males. For every 100 females age 18 and over, there were 80.2 males.

The median income for a household in the CDP was $37,625, and the median income for a family was $28,750. Males had a median income of $25,455 versus $15,938 for females. The per capita income for the CDP was $8,290. About 25.6% of families and 34.8% of the population were below the poverty line, including 40.7% of those under age 18 and 34.6% of those age 65 or over.

Education
It is in Gallup-McKinley County Public Schools.

Zoned schools are: Twin Lakes Elementary School in Twin Lakes, Tohatchi Middle School in Tohatchi, and Tohatchi High School in Tohatchi.

See also

 List of census-designated places in New Mexico

References

External links

 Coyote Canyon Chapter, Brimhall, NH

Census-designated places in McKinley County, New Mexico
Census-designated places in New Mexico
Populated places on the Navajo Nation